Ezhamathe Varavu (English:Seventh Arrival) is a 2013 Malayalam drama thriller film written by M. T. Vasudevan Nair and directed by Hariharan. The film stars Indrajith, Vineeth, Bhavana and Kavitha in the lead roles while Mamukkoya and Nandhu play pivotal supporting roles. The film has music composed by the director himself who also produced the film under the banner of Gayatri Cinema Enterprises.

The film's script was written by M. T. Vasudevan Nair in the 1970s and was filmed by Hariharan himself in the name Evideyo Oru Sathru with veteran actor Sukumaran playing an important role (this character was donned by his son Indrajith Sukumaran in the 2013 film). However, the original film, which was buffed in the industry circles to be a trendsetter, did not get a commercial release.

Synopsis
Set in the forests of Wayanad, Ezhamathe Varavu is a multilayered story that delineates the link between man and nature. It revolves around three principal characters — a planter, his wife and his friend. Gopi, a wealthy planter is an Alpha male, a hunter who assumes he knows the jungle and its creatures. Bhavana plays his long-suffering wife, who craves for his company and affection. Into their turbulent marriage comes Vineeth, an archaeologist on a dig in Wayanad. He turns out to be her college beau. Kavitha plays a tribal who introduces Vineeth to the forests and its inhabitants.

Cast
 Indrajith as Gopinath
 Vineeth as Prasad
 Bhavana as Bhanu
 Kavitha Nair (Mohana) as Mala
 Mamukkoya as Nagu
 Nandhu as Raman Nair
 Koottickal Jayachandran as the Driver
 Santhakumari as Tribal Woman
 Suresh Krishna as the forest ranger
 Captain Raju as the chief archaeologist

Production
The film was shot mostly from various parts of Wayanad and Kozhikode districts in Kerala. The bungalow where the film is mostly set is located in Kinalur, near Balussery in Kozhikode district. Some parts of the film was shot outside India as there is a ban on shooting on film certain wild animals, including the tiger. The scenes involving the tiger was shot from Australia.

References

External links
 

Films with screenplays by M. T. Vasudevan Nair
2013 films
2010s Malayalam-language films
Films directed by Hariharan
Indian thriller drama films
2013 thriller drama films
Films set in Kerala
Films shot in Kerala
Films shot in Kozhikode
2013 drama films